Mehran Mehrnia (Persian: مهران مهرنیا; born 13 July 1969) is an Iranian classical musician, tar and setar player and composer. He is the founder and the lead performer of Homayoun Group. 

Mehrnia has published several albums including Naghmeh-ye Hamrazan collaboration with Iranian singer Salar Aghili and Tale'e Mehr based on old Tasnifs by Abdollah Tale Hamedani. Mehrnia has led several group performances of Iranian classical music outside Iran including in Estonia, Poland and Vietnam. Mehrnia has worked with Iranian musician Mohammad-Reza Lotfi and after Lotfi's death, Mehrnia has performances has been dedicated to Lotfi's memory

References 

Living people
1969 births
Iranian composers
Tar players
Persian classical musicians